The Cyprus Port & Marine Police is the marine police and the civilian Coast Guard wing of the Cyprus Police, and are tasked with the primary mission of law enforcement of the waters around, and control of the sea borders of the Republic of Cyprus. Main roles are reported to include law enforcement of illicit activities such as smuggling, terrorism, piracy and illegal fishing. The Cyprus Port and Marine Police also serve a role as a search and rescue (SAR) force. This force is equipped with patrol boats and radars.

Cyprus Marine Police boats are notable by the "PV-" (Patrol Vessel) and "PL-" (Patrol Launch) prefixes on their pennant numbers, painted on the side of the hull.

History

In 1956 a special committee, set up by the then British Colonial Government for the re-organisation of Cyprus Police, included in its report a proposal for the establishment of a Port and Marine Police in Cyprus. The new Service was set up the following year equipped with seven boats. It operated as an independent Police Division with its headquarters at Famagusta and 2 permanent stations in Limassol and Larnaca. It also had a sub-station in Kyrenia which operated during the summer. In 1960, with the establishment of the independent Republic of Cyprus, the Port and Marine Police became a branch of the Police and the Gendarmerie.

The Turkish invasion of 1974 was a great blow for the Port and Marine Police as its installations at Famagusta Port were destroyed and five out of its seven boats were seized by the Turkish Army. After this great loss it continued to operate but only with two boats at its stations in Larnaca and Limassol. Its headquarters were transferred from Famagusta to the old port of Limassol.

Developments since 1974

In 1981-83, two Plascoa launches were acquired from France, equipped with 1 20mm Oerlikon L70 cannon, one 12.7mm and two 7.62mm machine guns. One of them was deleted from the service in 1991, another in 2000-2004.

In 1986, six local build Astrapi V (Fletcher Malibu) small Speed Boats. Later (circa 2004-2006) replaced by NOVAMARINE R.I.B. boats.

In 1991, two FAC-23 patrol vessels were acquired from Yugoslavia, initially equipped with 1 20mm .90cal cannon and two 7.62mm machine guns,  later replaced by 3 12.7 mm machine guns.

In 1992, five SAB-12 launches were transferred from Germany to Cyprus, without armament.

In 1998, a single Shaldag patrol vessel was acquired from Israel, initially equipped with 1 20mm .90cal cannon and two 12.7mm machine guns,  later replaced by 3 12.7 mm machine guns.

In 2004, Cyprus took delivery of two FPB 30M (P-190) class patrol vessels from Cantierre Navale Vittoria. These were initially equipped with 1 12.7 mm  and 2 7.62mm machine guns (on the forecastle, later also replaced with 12.7 mm machine guns).

In 2010, according to local press, Port and Marine Police fleet planning to receive 2 more patrol boats (Length - approx. 15-16 meter, Width - 4–5 meters, Speed - not less than 43 knots).

In 2013, according to local press, the Port and Marine Police acquired two new police boats, that were purchased from Greece, as part of the cross-border cooperation program between the two countries. The two boats were purchased for €60m and are equipped with portable thermal scopes and other sophisticated equipment to combat various forms of organised cross-border crime such as illegal immigration and the smuggling of drugs and weapons in the area. The €48m of the total cost of the program has been funded by the EU.

Administration

Headquartered in Limassol the Port and Marine Police is administered by its Commander and Assistant Commanders.

The Commander has both administrative and operational responsibility and is accountable to the Chief of Police through the Assistant Chief of Support.

The Port and Marine Police includes the following offices: Message Control Centre, Registry, Stores, Accounts Office, Security Office and Operations Office.

Stations
The Port and Marine Police is made up of the following stations:
 Latsi Port and Marine Station
 Paphos Port and Marine Station
 Limassol New Port Station
 Limassol Marine Station
 Ayios Raphael Marina Port Station
 Larnaca Port and Marine Station
 Larnaca Marina Port Station
 Ayia Napa Marine Station
 Paralimni Marine Station

Fleet since 1980

The Port and Marine Police Fleet at present is made up of 16 boats which can be divided into three categories according to their size, construction, capability and mission. The three categories are:
Category A Includes five fast sea patrol boats (F.P.B – JET) which can operate within a large radius – contiguous zone and open sea.

Category B Includes five patrol boats (SAB – 12) which can operate within a medium-range radius – within territorial waters.

Category C Includes six small inflatable speed boats (R.I.B./SP7) – mostly used close to shore.

See also
 Cyprus Joint Rescue Coordination Center
 Cyprus Navy
 Cyprus Police
 Cyprus Police Aviation Unit
 Cyprus Police Museum

References

External links

 Cyprus National Guard Official website (Navy section)
 Cyprus Border Marine Official website

Coast guards
1960 establishments in Cyprus
Specialist law enforcement agencies of Cyprus
Government agencies established in 1960
Maritime law enforcement agencies

ru:Военно-морские силы и Морская полиция Кипра